Håvard Haukenes (born 22 April 1990) is a Norwegian athlete. He has competed in two Olympic games in the 50 kilometre walk.

He made his World Championships debut in Moscow 2013, later in 2015 World Championships in Beijing. His first Olympic Games was the 2016 Olympic Games, where he placed 7th in the 50 kilometre walk.

Haukenes was also ranked as worldleader in 2017 leading into World Championship in London. In 2018, he finniched 4th in the European championship in Berlin. In 2019 he was ranked as number 5 in the world. In 2020 he did a national record on 30 km walk. Haukenes competed also in the Olympic games in Tokyo 2021. He has also competed in several IAAF World Race Walking Cups.

Haukenes come from Paradis, Bergen. He represent the club ILI Bul.

References

External links
 
 
 
 
 

1990 births
Living people
Sportspeople from Bergen
Norwegian male racewalkers
World Athletics Championships athletes for Norway
Athletes (track and field) at the 2016 Summer Olympics
Olympic athletes of Norway
Athletes (track and field) at the 2020 Summer Olympics
21st-century Norwegian people